Antheunis is a Dutch surname. Notable people with this name include the following:

Etienne Antheunis (born 1947), Belgian cyclist
Franciscus Henricus Antheunis, known as Franciscus Henri (born 1947), Dutch-born Australian entertainer
Gentil Theodoor Antheunis (1840 – 1907), Belgian poet
Yorique Antheunis (born 1991), Belgian footballer

See also

Filip Anthuenis
Theunis

Dutch-language surnames